Dave Mann (born 1 February 1957) is a Canadian archer. He competed in the men's individual event at the 1976 Summer Olympics.

References

External links
 

1957 births
Living people
Canadian male archers
Olympic archers of Canada
Archers at the 1976 Summer Olympics
Sportspeople from Vancouver
20th-century Canadian people
21st-century Canadian people